Bobby Alexander was a Scottish footballer who played for Kilmarnock Amateurs, Troon, Kilmarnock and Hamilton Academical.

Alexander made his debut for Hamilton on 2 September 1964 against Ayr United, winning 1–0. He scored a hat-trick against Berwick Rangers on 23 September 1964. During his time at the Accies, he mainly played left wing, made 37 appearances and scored 13 goals.

References

Scottish footballers
Association football wingers
Possibly living people
Year of birth missing